"Gotta Get Away" is a song by American rock band the Black Keys. It was released as the fourth single from their eighth studio album, Turn Blue, on August 19, 2014. Rolling Stone ranked the song number 24 on its list of the "50 Best Songs of 2014".

Charts

Weekly charts

Year-end charts

Release history

References

The Black Keys songs
Songs written by Dan Auerbach
Songs written by Patrick Carney
2014 singles
2014 songs